The current flag of Tuvalu was instated when the country became independent in 1978, after the separation from the Gilbert and Ellice Islands in 1976.

Features

Like many former and current British dependencies, the Tuvaluan flag is a blue ensign based on the Union Flag, which is shown in the canton of the flag; but has a sky blue field rather than the conventional blue. The previous flag (with the Gilberts) was also based on the Union Flag but with the coat of arms created by Sir Arthur Grimble in 1932, the resident commissioner of the British colony.

The stars represent the nine islands which comprise Tuvalu; the arrangement is geographically correct, with the east towards the top (i.e. north to the left).

The first inhabitants of Tuvalu were Polynesian people. The islands came within the British Empire's sphere of influence in the late 19th century. The Ellice Islands were administered by Britain as part of a protectorate from 1892 to 1916 and as part of the Gilbert and Ellice Islands Colony from 1916 to 1974. In 1974 the Ellice Islanders voted for separate British dependency status as Tuvalu, separating from the Gilbert Islands which became Kiribati upon independence. Tuvalu became a fully independent Commonwealth realm in 1978.

Changes and controversies
The name "Tuvalu" means "eight together", referring to the eight islands which were inhabited. In October 1995 one of the stars on the flag was removed to conform with the country's name. By January 1996 the flag was replaced with a new one which was not based on the British flag, but the eight stars were retained. This flag, however, was not liked by the inhabitants, who felt that it was a move towards replacing the popular Tuvaluan monarchy with a republic. In one incident, the people of Niutao, one of Tuvalu's nine atolls, chopped down the flagpole as soon as the new flag was raised. The old flag was reinstated in 1997, with all nine stars being restored. Population pressures have since resulted in the ninth island being settled.

Historical flags

See also

References

External links

Tuvalu National Flag Act 1995 paclii.org
Tuvalu National Flag (Amendment) Act 1997 paclii.org

Tuvalu
Tuvalu
National symbols of Tuvalu
Tuvalu
Tuvalu